Marco Mak Chi-Sin (born 6 November 1951) is a Hong Kong film director, film editor, production manager, actor, screenwriter, film producer, music composer and assistant director.

Filmography

Production manager
 Crazy Romance (1985)
 Why Why Tell Me Why (1986)

Director
 The Blood Rules (2000)
 Love Correction (2000)
 A Gambler's Story (2001)
 The Replacement Suspects (2001)
 Cop on a Mission (2001)
 The Wall (2002)
 The Peeping (2002)
 Haunted Office (2002)
 XanDa (2003)
 Colour of the Truth (2003)
 Set to Kill (2005)
 Slim Till Dead (2005)
 Wo hu (2006)
 House of Mahjong (2007)
 Dancing Lion (2007)

Editor
 The Discharged (1977)
 Bruce and Shaolin Kung Fu 2 (1978)
 Edge of Fury (1978)
 The Tattoo Connection (1978)
 The Wickedness in Poverty (1979)
 The Incredible Kung Fu Master (1979)
 The Killer in White (1980)
 Absolute Monarch (1980)
 The Legal Illegal (1981)
 Don't Kill Me, Brother (1981)
 Trap (1982)
 I Do! (1983)
 Yu Pui Tsuen (1986)
 The Story of Dr. Sun Yat Sen (1986)
 Watch Out (1986)
 A Terra-Cotta Warrior (1989)
 A Better Tomorrow III (1989)
 Runaway Blues (1989)
 Chinese Cop Out (1989)
 Erotic Nights (1989)
 Angel III (1989)
 Swordsman (1990)
 Temptation Summary (1990)
 A Chinese Ghost Story II (1990)
 Red and Black (1991)
 A Chinese Ghost Story III (1991)
 Bullet for Hire (1991)
 Queen's High (1991)
 King of Chess (1991)
 The Banquet (1991)
 Scheming Wonders (1991)
 Once Upon a Time in China (1991)
 The Raid (1991)
 The Master (1992)
 Fight Back to School II (1992)
 Twin Dragons (1992)
 Once Upon a Time in China II (1992)
 Swordsman 2 (1992)
  The Wicked City (1992)
 A Kid from Tibet (1992)
 Iron Monkey (1993)
 The Magic Crane (1993)
 Once Upon a Time in China IV (1993)
 Once Upon a Time in China III (1993)
 Forging the Swords (1994)
 Once Upon a Time in China V (1994)
 The Lovers (1994)
 Love in the Time of Twilight (1995)
 Sixty Million Dollar Man (1995)
 Mean Street Story (1995)
 The Chinese Feast (1995)
 Shanghai Grand (1996)
 Dr. Wai in The Scripture with No Words (1996)
 Full Alert (1997)
 We're No Bad Guys (1997)
 Once Upon a Time in China and America (1997)
 Mr. Wai-go (1998)
 The Poet (1998)
 Cheap Killers (1998)
 Love Generation Hong Kong (1998)
 Step Into the Dark (1998)
The Storm Riders (1998)
 The Black Sheep Affair (1998)
 Knock Off (1998)
 The Suspect (1998)
 A True Mob Story (1998)
 Young and Dangerous: The Prequel (1998)
 Operation Billionaires (1998)
 Your Place or Mine! (1998)
 A Chinese Torture Chamber Story II (1998)
 How to Get Rich by Fung Shui? (1998)
 The Group (1998)
 Young and Dangerous 5 (1998)
 The Conman (1998)
 The Mirror (1999)
 Body Weapon (1999)
 No Problem (1999)
 Erotic Nightmare (1999)
 Gigolo of Chinese Hollywood (1999)
 The H.K. Triad (1999)
 Horoscope 1: The Voice from Hell (1999)
 The Conmen in Vegas (1999)
 The Legend of Speed (1999)
 Century of the Dragon (1999)
 Prince Charming (1999)
 Fall for You (2000)
 Love Paradox (2000)
 Time and Tide (2000)
 Raped by An Angel 5: The Final Judgement (2000)
 Miles Apart (2000)
 Winner Takes All (2000)
 The Duel (2000)
 Fist Power (2000)
 My Name Is Nobody (2000)
 Those Were the Days... Cop on a Mission (2001)
 Maniacal Night (2001)
 The Replacement Suspects (2001)
 A Gambler's Story (2001)
 The Legend of Zu (2001)
 City of Desire (2001)
 Everyday Is Valentine (2001)
 Love au Zen (2001)
 The Wall (2002)
 The Wesley's Mysterious Story (2002)
 Black Mask II: City of Masks (2002)
 The Era of Vampires (2002)
 Fighting to Survive (2002)
 The Peeping (2002)
 Beauty and the Breast (2002)
 XanDa (2003)
 Colour of the Truth (2003)
 Hidden Heroes (2004)
 Fantasia (2004)
 Set to Kill (2005)
 Himalaya Singh (2005)
 The Shopaholics (2006)
 Kung Fu League (2018)

Assistant director
 Don't Kill Me, Brother (1981)
 New York Chinatown (1982)

Producer
 Forging the Swords (1994)

Music composer
 The Mirror (1999)

Actor
 Love Correction (2000)
 A Gambler's Story (2001)
 Happy Family (2002)
 The Spy Dad (2003)

Writer
 The Replacement Suspects (2001)
 The Wall'' (2002)

References

External links
 
 HK cinemagic entry

Hong Kong film directors
Hong Kong film producers
Hong Kong screenwriters
Hong Kong film editors
Living people
1951 births